Beibut Amirhanovich Shumenov (born 19 August 1983) is a Kazakhstani former professional boxer. He is a multiple-time world champion in two weight classes, having held the WBA (Regular) cruiserweight title twice between 2016 and January 2021 and the WBA light-heavyweight title from 2010 to 2014.

Early life
Shumenov’s mother was a schoolteacher and his father was a chief accountant. Both worked long hours and Shumenov was left with two aunts to look after him. Shumenov nearly died as a baby, after severe complications from consuming spoiled milk while in the care of his aunts. Even though he eventually recovered, the lingering effects of his health scare stuck with him throughout childhood.

Shumenov developed a love for combat sports while watching Bruce Lee films and began practicing numerous martial arts disciplines as he matured.

As a young man Shumenov earned a law degree and clerked for a judge at the same time he was honing his skills as a fighter.

Amateur career
Shumenov represented Kazakhstan in the 2004 Summer Olympics. His results were:

Defeated Aleksy Kuziemski (Poland) 34-22
Lost to Ihsan Yildirim Tarhan (Turkey) 19-27

He qualified for the Athens Games by winning the gold medal at the 2004 Asian Amateur Boxing Championships in Puerto Princesa, Philippines. In the final he defeated PR of China's Lei Yuping.

Professional career
Shumenov moved to the United States and based himself in Las Vegas where he turned professional in March 2007. In his debut in North Carolina, he defeated Walter Edwards with a knockout (KO) in the first round. He followed this up with another two KO wins within four months.

In March 2008, he returned to Kazakhstan to fight Donnell Wiggins for the vacant WBC Asian and WBA-PABA interim light-heavyweight titles. Shumenov quickly dispatched the experienced Wiggins with a second-round KO and the next month beat former US national Golden Gloves champion Lavell Finger in the first round to add the vacant WBO Asia Pacific title to his WBA-PABA interim and WBC Asian titles.

His most high-profile fight came in August 2008 when he faced former world champion Montell Griffin in Chimkent, Kazakhstan to defend his regional WBC and WBO titles. Shumenov was taken to the scorecards for the first time in his career but won the fight clearly, winning every round on all three judges cards.

He was targeting a fight with then WBO light-heavyweight champion Zsolt Erdei.

WBA light-heavyweight champion

On 15 August 2009 and with only eight professional bouts on his record, he received a shot at the WBA light-heavyweight title when he took on the Gabriel Campillo. The fight took place in Shumenov's home country of Kazakhstan and resulted in the first loss of his career when Campillo was declared the winner by majority decision (MD). A rematch took place on 9 January 2010, with the result being reversed with Shumenov being declared the winner by what was considered an extremely controversial split decision (SD). With this victory he became the quickest man ever to win a world title in the light-heavyweight division, beating the record of fifteen fights set by Jeff Harding in 1989.

Shumenov made the first defense of his title on 23 July 2010 when he won a unanimous decision (UD) against the previously unbeaten Viacheslav Uzelkov. Shumenov then arranged to have a unification fight with the then WBO champion Jürgen Brähmer, with the fight scheduled to take place in Kazakhstan on 8 January 2011. However, days before the fight was due to take place, Brähmer left Kazakhstan and returned to Germany, citing illness as his reason for dropping out of the fight. In his place, former middleweight world champion William Joppy stepped in at short notice, and was knocked out by Shumenov in the sixth round.

He successfully defended his title in Las Vegas on 29 July 2011 against former Contender star Danny Santiago and again on 2 June 2012 in Las Vegas against Enrique Ornelas.

Shumenov was promoted to WBA (Super) champion and retained the WBA (Super) and IBA light-heavyweight titles against Tomáš Kovács on 14 December 2013.

Shumenov vs. Hopkins 
Shumenov fought Bernard Hopkins in a unification bout on 19 April 2014, losing his WBA (Super) and IBA light-heavyweight titles. Shumenov lost the fight via split-decision, with the judges scoring the fight 116-111 and 116-111 for Hopkins, while the third had it 113-114 for Shumenov.

WBA cruiserweight champion and retirement

Shumenov vs. Flores 
Shumenov defeated BJ Flores by a UD for WBA interim cruiserweight title at the Palms Casino Resort in Las Vegas on 25 July 2015 in a Premier Boxing Champions bout broadcast live on NBCSN. Flores pressed the action throughout the fight, serving as the aggressor for much of the night. Shumenov began ramping up his offense in round eight, throwing combinations and taking advantage of a tiring Flores. With ten seconds left to go in the fight, Flores landed a punishing right hand that sent Shumenov careening into the ropes. Flores didn’t have enough time to take advantage of the opportunity and inflict more damage on a suddenly vulnerable Shumenov, resulting in a UD victory for Shumenov.

Shumenov vs. Wright 
On 21 May, 2016, Shumenov fought Junior Anthony Wright for the vacant WBA cruiserweight title. Shumenov won the fight via a tenth-round TKO.

In June 2017, Shumenov retired at the age of 33 because of an eye injury. This retirement would be short-lived, as he returned in July 2018 to win back the vacant WBA (Regular) cruiserweight title.

Shumenov vs. Altunkaya 
Shumenov won back the WBA against Hizni Altunkaya, who was ranked #3 at cruiserweight by the WBA. Shumenov won the fight convincingly, winning 90-79 on all three scorecards.

Professional boxing record

References

External links

Beibut Shumenov - Profile, News Archive & Current Rankings at Box.Live

 

 

 

1983 births
Living people
Boxers trained by Kevin Barry
Boxers at the 2004 Summer Olympics
Olympic boxers of Kazakhstan
Kazakhstani male boxers
Light-heavyweight boxers
Cruiserweight boxers
World Boxing Association champions
World light-heavyweight boxing champions
World cruiserweight boxing champions
People from Shymkent